Asgarabad (also Romanized as ‘Asgarābād) is a village in Miyan Kaleh Rural District, in the Central District of Behshahr County, Mazandaran Province, Iran. At the 2006 census, its population was 537, in 134 families.

References 

Populated places in Behshahr County